E. P. James Paul was a Scottish amateur football centre forward who played in the Scottish League for Queen's Park. He was capped by Scotland at amateur level.

Career statistics

References 

Scottish footballers
Queen's Park F.C. players
Scottish Football League players
Scotland amateur international footballers
Association football forwards
Year of birth missing
Year of death missing
Place of birth missing